A trichotomy can refer to:

 Law of trichotomy, a mathematical law that every real number is either positive, negative, or zero
 Trichotomy theorem, in finite group theory
 Trichotomy (jazz trio), Australian jazz band, collaborators with Danny Widdicombe on a 2019 album
 Trichotomy (philosophy), series of three terms used by various thinkers
 Trichotomy (speciation), three groups from a common ancestor, where it is unclear or unknown in what chronological order the three groups split
 Trichotomous or 3-forked branching in botany

See also 
 Tripartite (disambiguation)
 Triune (disambiguation)